The West African wattle-eye (Platysteira hormophora) is a species of bird in the family Platysteiridae.
It is found in Benin, Ivory Coast, Ghana, Guinea, Liberia, Sierra Leone, and Togo.
Its natural habitats are subtropical or tropical moist lowland forests, subtropical or tropical swamps, and moist savanna.

References

West African wattle-eye
Birds of West Africa
West African wattle-eye
Taxobox binomials not recognized by IUCN